WVYB (103.3 FM) is a radio station broadcasting a Top 40 (CHR) format. Licensed to Holly Hill, Florida, United States, the station serves the Daytona Beach area.  The station is currently owned by Southern Stone Communications, LLC.

History
The station was assigned the call letters WAHJ on March 11, 1994.  On April 25, 1997, the station changed its call sign to WDXD and again on November 3, 1999, to the current WVYB.

References

External links

VYB
Radio stations established in 1996
Contemporary hit radio stations in the United States
1996 establishments in Florida